Datuk Seri Panglima Haji Abdul Rahman bin Dahlan (Jawi: عبدالرحمن بن دحلان; born 24 November 1965) is a Malaysian politician. He is the former Minister in the Prime Minister's Department and the Minister of Urban Wellbeing, Housing and Local Government. He is also the former Member of Parliament (MP) of Malaysia for the Kota Belud constituency in Sabah, representing the United Malay National Organisation (UMNO) party, a component of Barisan Nasional (BN).

Abdul Rahman was elected to Parliament in the 2008 general election for the UMNO-held seat of Kota Belud, after UMNO dropped its incumbent member Salleh Said Keruak. Before his election he was a party official for UMNO.

On 16 May 2013, after the 2013 general elections he was appointed as Minister of Urban Wellbeing, Housing and Local Government under the cabinet of Prime Minister Najib Razak. On 28 June 2016, he was appointed to be the Minister in the Prime Minister's Department in charge of Economic Planning Unit. He was the first Sabahan to hold the EPU position.

In 2018, he was widely acknowledged as the person entrusted by the Prime Minister to secure Saudi Aramco’s USD7 billion investment in Malaysia.

In the 2018 general elections, Abdul Rahman had switched to contest the Sepanggar parliamentary seat but had lost to Azis Jamman of Sabah Heritage Party (WARISAN).

Most people attributed his loss in Sepanggar to an incorrect strategy by the party top leadership, knowing that Abdul Rahman was still hugely popular in Kota Belud constituency which he had represented for 10 years. Despite Abdul Rahman’s strong objection, the party went ahead with the decision to put him as a candidate in Sepanggar. In the end, the instruction for him to switch to Sepanggar, a new constituency for him, barely 3 months before the parliamentary general election in 2018 was proven flawed and disastrous for the party. UMNO lost both in Sepanggar and Kota Belud parliamentary seats, the latter because of voters’ anger towards UMNO for issuing instruction to Abdul Rahman to contest in Sepanggar.

In January 2021, Abdul Rahman was appointed as the Chairman of Board of Directors, Universiti Malaysia Sabah for a period of three years. He pledged to solve the construction delays afflicting the university’s teaching hospital and the students housing projects.

Election results

Honours
  :
  Grand Commander of the Order of the Territorial Crown (SMW) - Datuk Seri (2017)
  :
  Knight Companion of the Order of the Crown of Pahang (DIMP) - Dato’ (2005)
  :
  Commander of the Order of Kinabalu (PGDK) - Datuk (2013)
  Grand Commander of the Order of Kinabalu (SPDK) - Datuk Seri Panglima (2017)

References

External links 
 

Living people
Grand Commanders of the Order of Kinabalu
Commanders of the Order of Kinabalu
1965 births
Bajau people
People from Sabah
Members of the Dewan Rakyat
United Malays National Organisation politicians
Malaysian Muslims
Government ministers of Malaysia
Sonoma State University alumni
21st-century Malaysian people
Malaysian bloggers
Economy ministers of Malaysia